Steven Francis Gaughan (June 16, 1964June 21, 2005) was an American policeman from Prince George's County, Maryland, assigned to the Beltsville District, Special Assignment Team of the Prince George's County Police Department. In June 2005, he was shot and killed by Robert Mark Billett (born March 6, 1962) following a traffic stop in Laurel, Maryland.

Death
On Tuesday, June 21, 2005, Gaughan and his partners, Michael Eubanks and Shawn Phoebus, pulled over a suspicious vehicle near the intersection of Maryland Route 197 and South Laurel Drive in Laurel, Maryland. The three men in the car fled when the car was stopped. While chasing one of the men, Robert M. Billett, shots were exchanged, and during this exchange both Billett and Gaughan were hit.  Gaughan took a fatal hit and died at Prince George's Hospital Center several hours later.

Billett was convicted of first-degree murder and sentenced to life in prison without the possibility of parole.

Legacy

Street corner dedication
On July 14, 2007, the City of Boston dedicated the street corner where Gaughan grew up to his memory by renaming it Steven F. Gaughan Corner. A portion of the street on which he was killed was also renamed Steven F. Gaughan Drive. Gaughan's name is also engraved on the National Law Enforcement Officers Memorial in Washington, D.C.

See also

List of American police officers killed in the line of duty

References

External links
Steven F. Gaughan at ODMP

1964 births
2005 deaths
2005 murders in the United States
Deaths by firearm in Maryland
Male murder victims
American police officers
People from Prince George's County, Maryland
People murdered in Maryland